The Palazzo Brignole Sale or Palazzo Rosso is a house museum located in Via Garibaldi, in the historical center of Genoa, in Northwestern Italy. The palace is part of the UNESCO World Heritage Site Genoa: Le Strade Nuove and the system of the Palazzi dei Rolli. The rich art collection inside, along with the galleries of Palazzo Bianco and Palazzo Doria Tursi, is part of the Musei di Strada Nuova  and consists of the works of artists of the caliber of Antoon van Dyck, Guido Reni, Paolo Veronese, Guercino, Gregorio De Ferrari, Albrecht Dürer, Bernardo Strozzi and Mattia Preti.

History 
Built in 1675, Palazzo Rosso was not one of the 163 Palazzi dei Rolli of Genoa, the selected private residences where the notable guests of the Republic of Genoa were hosted during State visits, as the last of such list was completed in 1664, ten years before the construction of the palace. As a distinguished 17th-century palace in Strada Nuova, however, on 13 luglio del 2006 it was included in the list of 42 palaces which now form the UNESCO World Heritage Site Genoa: Le Strade Nuove and the system of the Palazzi dei Rolli. In 1874, the last descendant of the family, the Duchess of Galliera Maria Brignole Sale, bequeathed to the Municipality of Genoa the palace and the art collections therein, which constitute the first nucleus of today's art gallery.

After 3 years of renovation, the Palazzo reopened in June 2022.

The Art Collections 
The art collection includes:

Guercino:
 The Dying Cleopatra The Suicide of Cato Madonna and Child with the Infant John the Baptist, Saint John the Evangelist and Saint BartholomewVeronese:
 Judith and HolofernesGregorio De Ferrari:
 Frescoes of Spring and SummerAntoon van Dyck:
 Portrait of Paolina Adorno-Brignole-Sale Equestrian Portrait of Anton Giulio Brignole-Sale Christ Bearing His Cross Portrait of Filippo Spinola di Tassarolo Portrait of the goldsmith Pucci with his son Christ Driving out the Money-Lenders Portrait of Geronima Sale Brignole with her daughter AureliaAlbrecht Dürer:
 Portrait of a Young Venetian, 1506
Palma il Vecchio:
 Madonna and Child with Saint John the Baptist and Saint Mary Magdalene, circa 1520-1522
Guido Reni:
 Saint SebastianBernardo Strozzi:
 The Cook Madonna and Child with the Infant John the Baptist Boy Blowing on a TaperLudovico Carracci:
 AnnunciationGiovanni Battista Chiappe:
 Portrait of Doge Rodolfo Maria Brignole SaleGrechetto:
 The Journey of Abraham's Family Nativity The Sheep Escaping''

See also 
 Palazzo Bianco  
 Genoa: Le Strade Nuove and the system of the Palazzi dei Rolli
 Genoa 
 Via Garibaldi (Genoa)

References

Bibliography 
 Gioconda Pomella (2007), Guida Completa ai Palazzi dei Rolli Genova, Genova, De Ferrari Editore()
 Mauro Quercioli (2008), I Palazzi dei Rolli di Genova, Roma, Libreria dello Stato
 Fiorella Caraceni Poleggi (2001), Palazzi Antichi e Moderni di Genova raccolti e disegnati da Pietro Paolo Rubens (1652), Genova, Tormena Editore
 Mario Labò (2003), I palazzi di Genova di P.P. Rubens, Genova, Nuova Editrice Genovese

Gallery

External links 

Houses completed in 1677
Rosso
Palazzi dei Rolli
House of Brignole
Art museums and galleries in Genoa
1677 establishments in Italy
World Heritage Sites in Italy